Bernard Michael Moran (13 October 1930 – 21 April 2002) was an Australian rules footballer who played for the Carlton Football Club in the Victorian Football League (VFL).

Notes

External links 

Bernie Moran's profile at Blueseum

1930 births
2002 deaths
Carlton Football Club players
Australian rules footballers from Victoria (Australia)
Cobden Football Club players